Erlianomys combinatus is an extinct species of myodont rodent which existed in Inner Mongolia, China, during the early Eocene period.

References

Eocene rodents
Fossil taxa described in 2010
Eocene mammals of Asia